In the mathematical field of set theory, the proper forcing axiom (PFA) is a significant strengthening of Martin's axiom, where forcings with the countable chain condition (ccc) are replaced by proper forcings.

Statement 

The proper forcing axiom asserts that if P is proper and Dα is a dense subset of P for each α<ω1, then there is a filter G  P such that Dα ∩ G is nonempty for all α<ω1.

The class of proper forcings, to which PFA can be applied, is rather large. For example, standard arguments show that if P is ccc or ω-closed, then P is proper. If P is a countable support iteration of proper forcings, then P is proper. Crucially, all proper forcings preserve .

Consequences 
PFA directly implies its version for ccc forcings, Martin's axiom. In cardinal arithmetic, PFA implies . PFA implies any two -dense subsets of R are isomorphic, any two Aronszajn trees are club-isomorphic, and every automorphism of the Boolean algebra /fin is trivial. PFA implies that the Singular Cardinals Hypothesis holds.  An especially notable consequence proved by  John R. Steel is that the axiom of determinacy holds in L(R), the smallest inner model containing the real numbers. Another consequence is the failure of square principles and hence existence of inner models with many Woodin cardinals.

Consistency strength 

If there is a supercompact cardinal, then there is a model of set theory in which PFA holds.

It is not yet known how much large cardinal strength comes from PFA.

Other forcing axioms 

The bounded proper forcing axiom (BPFA) is a weaker variant of PFA which instead of arbitrary dense subsets applies only to maximal antichains of size ω1. Martin's maximum is the strongest possible version of a forcing axiom.

Forcing axioms are viable candidates for extending the axioms of set theory as an alternative to large cardinal axioms.

The Fundamental Theorem of Proper Forcing 

The Fundamental Theorem of Proper Forcing, due to Shelah, states that any countable support iteration of proper forcings is itself proper.

See also 
 Stevo Todorčević
 Saharon Shelah

References 

 
 
 
 

Axioms of set theory
Forcing (mathematics)